The Brunei Malay language, or Kedayan is the most widely spoken language in Brunei and a lingua franca in some parts of Sarawak and Sabah, such as Labuan, Limbang, Lawas, Sipitang and Papar. Though Standard Malay is promoted as the official national language of Brunei, Brunei Malay is socially dominant and it is currently replacing the minority languages of Brunei, including the Dusun and Tutong languages. It is quite divergent from Standard Malay to the point where it is almost mutually unintelligible with it. Although the idea that Brunei Malay might be classified as a creole language has been discredited, it does bear considerable similarities to East Indonesian Malay-based creole languages.

Phonology
The consonantal inventory of Brunei Malay is shown below:

Notes:
 is dental in many varieties of Malay, but it is alveolar in Brunei.
 is velar in initial position, but it is realised as uvular  in coda.
Parenthesised sounds occur only in loanwords.
All consonants can occur in word-initial position, except . Therefore, Standard Malay  'forest' became  in Brunei Malay, and Standard Malay  'black' became .
All consonants can occur in word-final position, except the palatals  and voiced plosives . Exceptions can be found in a few borrowed words such as  'March' and  'kebab'.

Acoustic variation in the realisation of these vowels is shown in the plot on the right, based on the reading of a short text by a single female speaker.

Language use

Brunei Malay, Kedayan and Kampong Ayer can be regarded as different dialects of Malay. Brunei Malay is used by the numerically and politically dominant Brunei people, who traditionally lived on water, while Kedayan is used by the land-dwelling farmers, and the Kampong Ayer dialect is used by the inhabitants of the river north of the capital. It has been estimated that 94% of the words of Brunei Malay and Kedayan are lexically related.<ref
name="Not1991">Nothofer, B. (1991). The languages of Brunei Darussalam. In H. Steinhauer (Ed.), Papers in Austronesian Linguistics (pp. 151–172). Canberra: Australian National University.</ref>

Coluzzi studied the street signs in Bandar Seri Begawan, the capital city of Brunei Darussalam. The researcher concluded that except Chinese, "minority languages in Brunei have no visibility and play a very marginal role beyond the family and the small community."

Vocabulary words

Studies
The vocabulary of Brunei Malay has been collected and published by several western explorers in Borneo including Pigafetta in 1521, De Crespigny in 1872, Charles Hose in 1893, A. S. Haynes in 1900, Sidney H. Ray in 1913, H. B. Marshall in 1921, and G. T. MacBryan in 1922, and some Brunei Malay words are included in A Malay-English Dictionary by R. J. Wilkinson.

The language planning of Brunei has been studied by some scholars.

References

Further reading

     
"Brunei Low Dialect" 
Haynes, A. S. “A List of Brunei-Malay words.” JSBRAS 34 ( July 1900): 39—48. 
Hose, Charles. No. 3. "A Journey up the Baram River to Mount Dulit and the Highlands of Borneo". The Geographical Journal. No. 3. VOL. I. (March, 1893)
MacBryan, G.T. 1922. Additions to a vocabulary of Brunei-Malay. JSBRAS. 86:376–377. 
Marshall, H.B. and Moulton, J.C. 1921, "A vocabulary of Brunei Malay", in Journal of the Straits Branch, Royal Asiatic Society.   
Marshall, H.B. 1921. A vocabulary of Brunei Malay. JSBRAS. 83:45–74. 
Ray, Sidney H. 1913. The Languages of Borneo. The Sarawak Museum Journal. 1,4:1–196.
Roth, Henry Ling. 1896. The Natives of Sarawak and British North Borneo. 2 vols. London: Truslove and Hanson. Rep. 1980. Malaysia: University of Malaya Press.  VOL I.  VOL II. VOL II.

External links
The Pronunciation of Brunei Malay

Malaysian culture
Agglutinative languages
Languages of Brunei
Languages of Malaysia
Malay dialects
Malayic languages